Yaniv Goldfarb, better known as Onyx, is a DJ from Israel. He charted at #66 on the UK Singles Chart in 2004 with his song Every Little Time.

References

Israeli DJs